The Gual and España conspiracy (1797) was a pro-independence movement in Colonial Venezuela, led by José María España and Manuel Gual. The Spanish revolutionary, Juan Bautista Mariano Picornell y Gomila, was involved. It is also believed that Simón Rodríguez, an early teacher of Simón Bolívar, was involved.

Sources 

History of Venezuela
18th century in Caracas